Florida M. Bautista is an independent film director in the Philippines. She is a Mass Communication graduate of the Pamantasan ng Lungsod ng Maynila. 
Her masterpiece, Saan Nagtatago si Happiness?, a light comedy semi-musical film with original songs and entertaining dance numbers, is one of the eight finalists in the 2006 Cinemalaya Philippine Independent Film Festival.

She directed the music video "Pretend I Don’t Love You" which won Metropop's First Music Video Making Contest. She took an Acting Workshop for Film and TV at ABS-CBN and a Playwriting Workshop at the  Cultural Center of the Philippines.

References

Year of birth missing (living people)
Living people
Filipino film directors
Filipino women film directors
Pamantasan ng Lungsod ng Maynila alumni